The nine-volt battery, or 9-volt battery, is an electric battery that supplies a nominal voltage of 9 volts. Actual voltage measures 7.2 to 9.6 volts, depending on battery chemistry. Batteries of various sizes and capacities are manufactured; a very common size is known as PP3, introduced for early transistor radios. The PP3 has a rectangular prism shape with rounded edges and two polarized snap connectors on the top. This type is commonly used for many applications including household uses such as smoke and gas detectors, clocks, and toys.

The nine-volt PP3-size battery is commonly available in primary zinc-carbon and alkaline chemistry, in primary lithium iron disulfide and lithium manganese dioxide (sometimes designated CRV9), and in rechargeable form in nickel-cadmium (Ni–Cd), nickel-metal hydride (Ni–MH) and lithium-ion. Mercury batteries of this format, once common, have been banned in many countries due to their toxicity. Designations for this format include NEDA 1604 and IEC 6F22 (for zinc-carbon) or MN1604 6LR61 (for alkaline). The size, regardless of chemistry, is commonly designated PP3—a designation originally reserved solely for carbon-zinc, or in some countries, E or E-block. A range of PP batteries was produced in the past, with voltages of 4.5, 6, and 9 volts and different capacities; the larger 9-volt PP6, PP7, and PP9 are still available. A few other 9-volt battery sizes are available: A10 and A29.

Most PP3-size alkaline batteries are constructed of six individual 1.5 V LR61 cells enclosed in a wrapper. These cells are slightly smaller than LR8D425 AAAA cells and can be used in their place for some devices, even though they are 3.5 mm shorter. Carbon-zinc types are made with six flat cells in a stack, enclosed in a moisture-resistant wrapper to prevent drying. Primary lithium types are made with three cells in series.

9-volt batteries accounted for 4% of alkaline primary battery sales in the United States in 2007, and 2% of primary battery sales and 2% of secondary (rechargeable) battery sales in Switzerland in 2008.

History

Historically, the now popular PP3 battery size was a member of the power pack (PP) battery family that was originally manufactured by Ever Ready in the United Kingdom and Eveready in the United States.  The company says that it introduced the PP3 battery in 1956, having been added as an ANSI standard in 1959, currently known as ANSI-1604A.

The PP11 consists of two isolated 4.5-volt batteries with four terminals.

Only the PP3, PP6, PP7 and PP9 sizes are still manufactured, with the PP3 being extremely common. Modern batteries have higher capacities and lower internal resistances than early versions.

Before the mid-1950s, in the days of vacuum tube (valve) radios used batteries designed specifically for vacuum tubes, there was a nine-volt grid bias battery or (US) "C" battery, which had taps for various voltages from 1.5 to 9 volts.

Early transistorized radios and other equipment needed a suitable voltage miniature battery. Early transistor radios required a -volt battery. Although the transistors would theoretically operate from lower voltages, the point-contact transistors used in 1954  had to be operated very close to their VCBO limit in order to get the required frequency response.  However, a suitable miniature battery was already marketed for (vacuum tube) hearing aids.

The PP3 (physically identical to 6LR61 or 1604A) appeared when portable transistor radios became common, and was referred to as a transistor battery or transistor-radio battery.

PP3 connectors

The PP3 battery has both terminals in a snap connector on one end. The smaller circular (male) terminal is positive, and the larger hexagonal or octagonal (female) terminal is the negative contact.  The connectors on the battery are the same as on the load device; the smaller one connects to the larger one and vice versa. The same snap-style connector is used on other battery types in the Power Pack (PP) series. Battery polarization is normally obvious, since mechanical connection is usually only possible in one configuration.

A problem with this type of connector is that two loose batteries with terminals exposed can touch and short circuit, discharging them, and generating heat and possibly a fire. Keeping nine-volt batteries in their packaging until use helps to avoid accidental discharge.

Technical specifications

Very often, a "9-volt" battery refers to the transistor radio size called PP3 or IEC 6F22 or NEDA 1604, although there are less common nine-volt batteries of different sizes.

Batteries of all types are manufactured in consumer and industrial grades. Costlier industrial-grade batteries may use chemistries that provide higher power-to-size ratio, have lower self-discharge and hence longer life when not in use, more resistance to leakage and, for example, ability to handle the high temperature and humidity associated with medical autoclave sterilization.

Testing and charging
Most battery voltage testers and chargers that can also test nine-volt need another snap clip to hold the battery, while cylindrical batteries often share a holder that may be adjustable in size.  Because of the proximity of the positive and negative terminals at the top of the battery and relatively low current of most common batteries, one informal method of testing voltage is to place the two terminals across a tongue. A strong tingle would indicate a battery with a strong charge, the absence, a discharged battery. While there have been stories circulating of unfortunate outcomes, the process is rarely dangerous under normal circumstances, though it may be unpleasant.

Lithium
Lithium 9-volt batteries are disposable high-energy-density batteries. In the PP3 size they are typically rated at 0.8–1.2 Ah (e.g. >1.2 Ah @ 900 ohms to 5.4 V @ 23 °C for one type), about twice the capacity of alkaline batteries. Some manufacturers claim the energy density can be five times that of alkaline. Common applications for lithium nine-volt batteries are smoke and carbon monoxide detectors.

See also

 Battery eliminator
 Battery nomenclature
 List of battery sizes
 List of battery types
 Self-discharge

Notes

References

External links
 

Battery shapes